Mount Sinai South Nassau is a hospital located in Oceanside, NY. The facility was opened in 1928 and has undergone rapid expansion since.  It is the Long Island flagship hospital for the Mount Sinai Health System.

Mount Sinai South Nassau, formerly South Nassau Communities Hospital, has a total of 455 beds.  It has expanded numerous times over the years and is now one of the main hospitals on the South Shore of Long Island. 

In 1996, South Nassau joined with Winthrop University Hospital to form Winthrop South Nassau University Health System. In 2003, the Winthrop South Nassau system joined NewYork-Presbyterian Hospital. 

In 2014, South Nassau opened a standalone emergency department in nearby Long Beach, after acquiring the former Long Beach Medical Center, which was severely damaged during Hurricane Sandy. Long Beach Medical Center was a full hospital before it closed, as opposed to a stand alone emergency department.

In 2017, South Nassau's former partner Winthrop joined Mount Sinai competitor NYU Langone Health. In 2018, South Nassau hospital joined the Mount Sinai Health System and rebranded as Mount Sinai South Nassau.   What caused Winthrop South Nassau to split from New York Presbyterian is unclear. It is also unknown when or why Winthrop and South Nassau split from each other.

References

External links

 NY.gov Profile

Hempstead, New York
Hospitals established in 1928